The Richest Man in Babylon is a 1926 book by George S. Clason that dispenses financial advice through a collection of parables set 4,097 years ago in ancient Babylon.  The book remains in print almost a century after the parables were originally published, and is regarded as a classic of personal financial advice.

Background
The parables are told by a fictional Babylonian character called Arkad, a poor scribe who became the "richest man in Babylon".  Included in Arkad's advice are the "Seven Cures" (or how to generate money and wealth), and the "Five Laws of Gold" (or how to protect and invest wealth). A core part of Arkad's advice is around "paying yourself first", "living within your means", "investing in what you know", the importance of "long-term saving", and "home ownership".

The content is from a series of pamphlets distributed by U.S. banks and insurance companies in 1920–24; the pamphlets were bound together and published as a book in 1926. The book is often referred to as a classic of personal financial advice, and appears in modern recommended reading lists on personal financial advice and wealth management, which has kept the book in print almost 90 years after its first edition with over 2 million copies sold.

Clason himself published an illustrated hardback edition in 1930 titled The Richest Man in Babylon and Other Stories which now sells for USD 1,250.

The unusual structure of the book has inspired many modern derivative works providing further discussion and insights on the parables.

Structure
The original 1926 book groups the parables into general themes of advice, and particularly "The Seven Cures" and the "Five Laws of Gold".

Some themes can overlap (e.g. The First Cure is similar to the First Law of Gold).

Seven Cures For a Lean Purse

The Five Laws of Gold

Other parables
The final chapters of the 1926 book cover individual parables:

 The Gold Lender of Babylon. Better a little caution than a great regret. 
 The Walls of Babylon. We cannot afford to be without adequate protection.
 The Camel Trader of Babylon. Where the determination is, a way can be found.

There is then an unusual section where a contemporary archeologist reveals five clay Babylonian tablets (numbered I to V), whose inscriptions provide short parables.

The final chapter in the 1926 book is on The Luckiest Man in Babylon.

See also
The Intelligent Investor
Think and Grow Rich
Poor Charlie's Almanack

References

External links
Full text of The Richest Man in Babylon at the Internet Archive

Finance books
Parables
1926 books
Penguin Books books